Nazyan (Pashto: نازيان) is a district in the south-east of Nangarhar Province, Afghanistan. Its population, which is 100% Pashtun, was estimated at 22,858 in 2002, of whom 9000 were children under 12.  The district is within the heartland of the Shinwari tribe of Pashtuns. The district centre is a village called Surubai For More information Contact ENG Aqibullah Shinwari 0790250400

References

 UNHCR District Profile, dated 2002-05-23, accessed 2006-07-20 (PDF).

The tribe which lives here is " Shinwari" & " Kochi "

External links

 Map of Nazyan district (PDF)

Districts of Nangarhar Province